Woman's Athletic Club is a historic building located along the Magnificent Mile in the Near North Side community area of Chicago, Illinois.  Founded in 1898, it is the home of the first athletic club for women in the United States.  It  was named a Chicago Landmark on October 2, 1991.

Notes

External links
Official website

Buildings and structures completed in 1928
Chicago Landmarks
Women's clubs in the United States
History of women in Illinois